Moussa Wagué (born 4 October 1998) is a Senegalese professional footballer who plays as a right-back for Senegal national team.

Club career

Eupen
Wagué joined K.A.S. Eupen from the Aspire Academy in November 2016. He made his professional debut in a 0–1 loss to Genk on 21 January 2017. Wagué spent two seasons with Eupen under coach Claude Makélélé, helping the team remain in the Belgian top division.

Barcelona
In August 2018, Wagué completed a transfer from Eupen to FC Barcelona, for a fee of €5 million. He initially joined the reserves ahead of the 2018–19 season. On 13 January 2019, Wagué scored his first goal for Barcelona B in a 2–0 win at the Miniestadi against CD Alcoyano.

Barcelona manager Ernesto Valverde named Wagué as one of the five promising young players to whom he hoped to give first team opportunities. Wagué made his senior side debut on 6 March 2019, starting and playing the full 90 minutes of the Catalan Super Cup against Girona. On 13 April 2019, he made his official debut in a La Liga match against Huesca where he played a full 90 minutes; he described it as a "dream come true". Wagué again featured for the first team on 4 May 2019, impressing despite Barcelona's 0–2 defeat to Celta Vigo. He would appear once more in Barcelona's La Liga finale, coming on as a second half substitute in a 2–2 draw with Eibar. 

Wagué was officially promoted to the first team ahead of the 2019–20 season, and given the number 16 shirt. He made his first Champions League start for Barcelona on 10 December 2019, as his side defeated Inter Milan 2–1.

Loan to Nice
In 31 January 2020, French club OGC Nice confirmed a loan transfer for Wagué, keeping him until the end of the 2019–20 season, with an option to buy for €15,000,000. He made his debut for Nice in their 2–1 victory over Lyon on 2 February 2020, coming on as a second half substitute. On 7 March 2020, Wagué provided the winning assist in Nice's 2–1 derby victory against rivals AS Monaco. Upon the cancellation of the Ligue 1 season due to the COVID-19 outbreak in France, he returned to Barcelona after Nice decided not to activate his purchase option.

Loan to PAOK
On 21 September 2020, Barcelona confirmed the loan transfer of Wagué to Greek side PAOK on loan for the rest of the season. On 13 December 2020, he suffered a severe knee injury during PAOK's local derby against Aris Thessaloniki. As a result he was slated to miss nine months of action.

Gorica
On 18 July 2022, he joined Prva HNL club Gorica On 9 December 2022, he was released from the club after having his contract mutually terminated.

International career
Wagué was part of the Senegal U20s that came in 4rd place at the 2015 FIFA U-20 World Cup. He made his senior international debut in a friendly 1–1 tie with Nigeria on 23 March 2017.

In June 2018, Wagué was named in Senegal's 23-man squad for the 2018 FIFA World Cup in Russia. He became the youngest African goalscorer in World Cup history when he scored in Senegal's match against Japan.

Wagué represented Senegal in the 2019 Africa Cup of Nations, which took place in Egypt. He participated in the first two group stage games and the semifinal match for a Senegal squad that reached the tournament final.

Career statistics

Club

International

International goal
As of match played 24 June 2018. Senegal score listed first, score column indicates score after each Wagué goal.

Honours
Barcelona
La Liga: 2018–19
PAOK
Greek Cup: 2020-21

National
Senegal U23
African Games: 2015

Senegal
Africa Cup of Nations runner-up: 2019

References

External links
Wague Maxifoot Profile

1998 births
Living people
People from Bignona
Senegalese footballers
Senegal international footballers
Senegal youth international footballers
Association football defenders
Belgian Pro League players
Segunda División B players
La Liga players
Ligue 1 players
Super League Greece players
Croatian Football League players
Aspire Academy (Senegal) players
K.A.S. Eupen players
FC Barcelona Atlètic players
FC Barcelona players
OGC Nice players
PAOK FC players
HNK Gorica players
Senegalese expatriate footballers
Expatriate footballers in Belgium
Senegalese expatriate sportspeople in Belgium
Expatriate footballers in Spain
Senegalese expatriate sportspeople in Spain
Expatriate footballers in France
Senegalese expatriate sportspeople in France
Expatriate footballers in Greece
Senegalese expatriate sportspeople in Greece
Expatriate footballers in Croatia
Senegalese expatriate sportspeople in Croatia
2018 FIFA World Cup players
2019 Africa Cup of Nations players